Mahesh Bhupathi and Leander Paes were the defending champions but only Paes competed that year with John-Laffnie de Jager.

de Jager and Paes lost in the first round to Robert Kendrick and Brian Vahaly.

Mardy Fish and Andy Roddick won in the final 6–4, 6–4 against Jan-Michael Gambill and Graydon Oliver.

Seeds
Champion seeds are indicated in bold text while text in italics indicates the round in which those seeds were eliminated.

  Bob Bryan /  Mike Bryan (quarterfinals)
  John-Laffnie de Jager /  Leander Paes (first round)
  Rick Leach /  David Macpherson (first round)
  Wayne Arthurs /  Paul Hanley (first round)

Draw

External links
 2002 U.S. Men's Clay Court Championships Doubles Draw

U.S. Men's Clay Court Championships
2002 U.S. Men's Clay Court Championships